= Conservation Reporting and Evaluation System =

US Natural Resources Conservation Service system

The Conservation Reporting and Evaluation System (CRES) is the system used by the Natural Resources Conservation Service (NRCS) in the United States to collect and compile information about staff activities, conservation program implementation, and program accomplishments.
